Naomi Shah is an American media executive. She started her career as a macro equities trader at Goldman Sachs, then joined the investment team at Union Square Ventures. In 2020, she founded venture-backed entertainment company Meet Cute when she was 24 years old. In 2022, Shah was included on the Forbes 30 Under 30 list and on Marie Claire’s first annual culture power list.

Early life and education
Shah was born in Portland, Oregon and attended Sunset High School (Beaverton, Oregon). In high school, Shah won the Inaugural Google Science Fair at the age of 16 and did a TED conference talk about her research. She placed first at the Intel Science Fair four years in a row.

Shah attended Stanford University, where she received her bachelor’s degree in mechanical engineering.

Career and business ventures
Shah founded Meet Cute on Valentine’s Day of 2020 to produce “feel good” Romantic comedy stories in audio form. Meet Cute raised over 9 million dollars in investment and has produced over 450 romantic comedies as original 15-minute scripted audio episodes with a network of over 1,000 content creators, including Sara Shepard, Julianne Hough, and Ellie Goulding.

In 2022, Meet Cute signed deals to expand their formats to TV, film, and short-form video. Their current shows have featured celebrities such as Amy Sedaris, Charithra Chandran and Noah Galvin.

Personal
Shah lives in San Francisco, California.

References

American entertainment industry businesspeople
Living people
American technology chief executives
American chief executives
21st-century publishers (people)
Businesspeople from Portland, Oregon
Women corporate executives
Year of birth missing (living people)